Earth-Three, or simply Earth-3 or Earth 3, is a “partially-reversed” Earth, where supervillainous counterparts of the mainstream DC superheroes reside. It first appeared in Justice League of America #29 (1964), and the concept has been rebooted several times.

Publication history

1964–1985: Original concept 

Earth-Three was introduced by Gardner Fox and Mike Sekowsky in a 1964 issue of Justice League of America. Earth-Three's history is depicted as a mirror image to that of the Earth we know. On Earth-Three, Christopher Columbus was American and discovered Europe; England (a colony of America) won freedom in a reversed form of the Revolutionary War (with George Washington surrendering his sword to Charles Cornwallis) in 1774; President John Wilkes Booth was assassinated by actor Abraham Lincoln. Crucially, Earth-Three was home to a villainous analogue to the Justice League, the Crime Syndicate of America.

The Crime Syndicate would recur as powerful enemies of the Justice League until DC's 1985 company-wide crossover, Crisis on Infinite Earths. Crisis revealed  that Lex Luthor, here called Alexander Luthor, is the only superhero on an Earth otherwise occupied entirely by villains, most of whom are reversed analogues of heroes on other DC Earths. Earth-Three is destroyed by waves of antimatter in the opening scenes of the series. The sole survivor is the son of Alexander and Lois Lane Luthor, Alexander Luthor, Jr. At the conclusion of the series, all other worlds in the Multiverse were merged.

1992–2011: Anti-matter Earth, new Multiverse
DC used Crisis on Infinite Earths to simplify its complex continuity and multiverse into a single narrative set on a single universe, not counting the antimatter universe which was integral to the story of how the Green Lantern villain Sinestro acquired his powers. Editorial mandate initially meant stories featuring the Crime Syndicate were entirely unavailable to writers, but DC later attempted to reintroduce the Crime Syndicate without the setting of Earth-Three in 1992's Justice League Quarterly #8, which featured a group of aliens from the planet Qward (the antimatter counterpart of Oa) who functioned as "more powerful" Justice League analogues.

This first attempt at bringing back the Crime Syndicate did not stick, and the principle concept behind Earth-Three would be revisited in Grant Morrison's JLA: Earth 2. Morrison recast much of Earth-Three's history as that of the Antimatter Universe's own version of Earth, which is home to the Crime Syndicate of America. He makes notable departures to this formula however, by presenting this world as the product of an alternate history and by reimagining various Crime Syndicate members (for example, by recasting Owlman as Batman's brother Thomas Wayne, and by recasting Ultraman not as the alien Kal-El but a human astronaut who acquires Kryptonian abilities). At the end of JLA: Earth-2, Amerika had launched a nuclear strike on London, against Britain's independence movement.

In Superman/Batman Annual #1, three members of this Crime Syndicate of Amerika—Ultraman, Owlman, and Superwoman—appear on the main DC Earth, along with an unnamed antimatter doppelganger of Deathstroke (whose behavior, including humorous breaking of the fourth wall, and powers are the same as Marvel Comics' Deadpool) hired to protect Bruce Wayne. The story supposedly takes place as the first time Superman and Batman figure out each other's identities, and matches Batman, Superman, and Deathstroke against their respective antimatter selves. The story is told by Mr. Mxyzptlk and may therefore be completely untrue.

In the final issue of the 52-issue weekly series 52 in 2007, a new Multiverse is revealed, originally consisting of 52 parallel realities. Among the parallel realities shown is one designated "Earth-3". As a result of Mister Mind "eating" aspects of this reality, it takes on visual aspects of the pre-Crisis Earth-Three. The Earth-3 concept was not heavily explored after this, but does figure in a couple of issues of 52s follow-up weekly series, Countdown to Final Crisis (2007–8). The name of the new Earth-3 team is revealed to be the Crime Society of America. The Crime Society are considered to be evil versions of the heroes of Earth-2, acting as a new Golden Age counterpart to the Antimatter Earth.  A hero known as the Jokester operates in this universe, as later do the Riddler, Three-Face (Evelyn Dent), and Duela Dent. In Countdown #31 the version of Zatanna (Annataz Arataz) from this world was used by Superman-Prime to keep Mister Mxyzptlk in check. Based on comments by Grant Morrison, this alternate universe is not the pre-Crisis Earth-Three. Despite the return of the DC Multiverse and the creation of a new Earth-3, the Antimatter Earth still exists in Qward, acting as an inverted microcosm of New Earth. The pre-established Crime Syndicate of Amerika from the Antimatter Universe were then featured heavily in Trinity, DC's third year-long weekly series.

2013–2016: The New 52
DC again rebooted its continuity in 2011 as part of The New 52. In 2013, the "Trinity War" crossover event reintroduces Earth-3. It is mentioned as the home of true evil and of the Crime Syndicate and that it was destroyed by an unknown entity. The Crime Syndicate is largely modeled after Morrison's, with the introduction of new characters, and by re-envisioning Ultraman once again as an alien with an origin story which more closely parallels Superman's. In the closing scenes of "Trinity War", Ultraman, Superwoman, Owlman, Johnny Quick, Power Ring, Deathstorm, Alfred Pennyworth and Atomica reveal themselves to the Justice League of New Earth. Sea King also inhabited Earth-3, but quickly died after passing through the gateway to New Earth.  An Earth-3 version Martian Manhunter is also revealed to exist. Alexander Luthor, who can become Mazahs, is also from Earth-3, and an enemy of the Crime Syndicate. The official site of DC Comics describes Earth-Three as a world where the values of "good" and "evil" are reversed, with "evil" being the way of the world.

2019-2021: DC Rebirth
At the end of Superman #8, it is revealed that Superman's son, Jon Kent, arrived on Earth-3 where he is confronted by the Crime Syndicate after leaving his grandfather, Jor-El. In issue #9, Jon further expands on his time on Earth-3. He was sent into a volcano where Ultraman kept him prisoner and described Jon's predicament to him, being stuck on another Earth. From what was shown, it appears that Ultraman kept Jon prisoner for years until Jon formulated a plan to escape and eventually did so. He sought out the heroes of this universe and found the Earth-3 version of the Hall of Justice. But, it turned out to be the headquarters of the Crime Syndicate, and Jon is confronted by Superwoman, who is apparently the wife of Ultraman.

Later, Young Justice found themselves trapped on Earth-3 after traveling through several different Multiverse Earths. They were soon attacked by their evil counterparts from that world.

2021-present Infinite Frontier

War for Earth-3 
The Titans and The Flash arrived on Earth-3 to find a missing student. The crossover between Suicide Squad, Teen Titans Academy, and The Flash saw Amanda Waller who wants to claim the Earth-3 with new members of her Justice Squad team. It is a five-part miniseries with two core issues.

Characters

Groups

Notes:

In other media

Television
 Earth-Three appears in the Batman: The Brave and the Bold animated series episode "Deep Cover for Batman".
 A variation of Earth-3 appears in live-action media set in the Arrowverse. Introduced in The Flash television series, this version of Earth-3 is home to Jay Garrick (portrayed by John Wesley Shipp) while elements of the comics' version of Earth-3 were used for Earth-2 instead. It is initially alluded to in season two before appearing in later seasons. During the events of the Arrowverse crossover "Crisis on Infinite Earths", Earth-3 was destroyed off-screen by the Anti-Monitor.

Film
Earth-3 appears in the animated film Justice League: Crisis on Two Earths.

Video games
Earth-3 is mentioned in Lego DC Super-Villains. It is the reality that the Crime Syndicate and the game's primary customizable character the "Rookie" came from.

References

DC Comics dimensions
DC Comics planets
Fiction about Earth
1964 in comics
Fictional elements introduced in 1964